Thomas Roger West (born November 1, 1948) is a former Republican member of the North Carolina House of Representatives representing the state's 120th district, including constituents in Cherokee, Clay, Graham and Macon counties.  A contractor from Marble, North Carolina, West served 8.5 term in the state House.

Possum drop law 
Representative West represented Brasstown, North Carolina, which holds an annual "Possum Drop" on New Year's Eve, which involves capturing a wild opossum, enclosing it in a clear plastic box, suspending it high in the air, and lowering it to the ground with the countdown to midnight. During the suspension and lowering, fireworks are set off, muskets are fired, crowds of people scream, and loud music is played.  The possum is later released. People for the Ethical Treatment of Animals filed a lawsuit in October 2013 attempting to outlaw the practice, claiming it makes it likely that the possum will die from stress-related ailments within days or weeks.

West was the sponsor of a law in the North Carolina House that exempts opossums from state wildlife laws from Dec. 26, 2014 to Jan. 2, 2015 in Clay County, where the drop is held. West jokingly noted when asked by another committee member that the marsupial community was in support of the bill. Its consideration was met with some joking by committee members and passed easily.

References

External links

|-

Republican Party members of the North Carolina House of Representatives
Living people
1948 births
People from Murphy, North Carolina
20th-century American politicians
21st-century American politicians